Ananthapuri Express is an express train running between  and  via , Nagercoil Town, Tirunelveli Junction, Madurai Junction, Tiruchchirappalli Junction and Villupuram Junction through the trunk line and chord lines in southern India. It is a daily overnight Express/Mail service.

History
The inauguration of this train was on 30 June 2002 operating six days a week. Later in 2005 it was made daily train. It was named Ananthapuri after the city Thiruvananthapuram. In 2017 railway budget, it was extended to Kollam with effect from 1 November 2017.

Route
It runs along the Kollam–Thiruvananthapuram trunk line and other chord lines through one among the shortest routes from Kollam to Chennai via Thiruvananthapuram, Nagercoil Town, Tirunelveli, Virudhunagar, Madurai, Tiruchirappalli (Trichy), Viluppuram and Chengalpattu.

Coach composition
In total 23 coaches are there. It includes One AC First Class (H), AC 2 Tier (A), AC 3 Tier (B), Sleeper Class (SL), Unreserved general sitting coach (GS) and End on Generators (SLRD).

The Ananthapuri Express between Chennai Egmore and Kollam has a rake sharing agreement (RSA) with Uzhavan Express (16865 / 16866) between Chennai and Thanjavur. The primary maintenanced by the four rakes of the express at Tiruchchirappalli (Trichy) coaching depot.

Incident
The engine of 16723 Express caught fire at Kollam Junction on 16 July 2018.

See also
 Kanniyakumari Express
 Guruvayur Express
 Pearl City Express
 Silambu Express
 Pothigai Express

References

External links

Rail transport in Kollam
Transport in Thiruvananthapuram
Transport in Chennai
Railway services introduced in 2002
Named passenger trains of India
Rail transport in Kerala
Rail transport in Tamil Nadu
Express trains in India